Alex P. Nankivell (born 25 October 1996) is a New Zealand rugby union player who plays for  in the Bunnings NPC and the  in Super Rugby. His position of choice is centre.

Career

In New Zealand
Nankivell made his debut for  during the 2015 ITM Cup against  in a 35–20 win for the Mako. He made his debut for the  during the 2017 Super Rugby season and was named in the Chiefs squad for the 2018 Super Rugby season. Nankivell's impressive 2019 season caught the eye of the Māori All Blacks selectors and he made his mark on the international stage against Fiji. Nankivell was part of the Tasman side that won the Mitre 10 Cup for the first time in 2019. In round 5 of the 2020 Mitre 10 Cup Nankivell played his 50th game for the Mako against  at Trafalgar Park in Nelson in a 33–7 win for the side. The Mako went on to win their second premiership title in a row.

Nankivell had a very strong season for the Chiefs in 2021, playing 12 games and scoring 2 tries as the side made the Super Rugby Aotearoa final. He was rewarded at the end of the Super Rugby season as he was named in the Māori All Blacks squad again.

Munster
Nankivell will join Irish United Rugby Championship club Munster on a two-year contract from the 2023–24 season.

References

External links
Tasman Profile
Chiefs Profile
Māori All Blacks Profile

1996 births
Living people
People educated at Christchurch Boys' High School
Rugby union players from Gisborne, New Zealand
New Zealand rugby union players
Tasman rugby union players
Chiefs (rugby union) players

New Zealand Māori rugby union players
Māori All Blacks players

Rugby union centres